Night Inn is a Chinese black-and-white film released in 1947, directed by Huang Zuolin and starring the popular Shanghai singer Zhou Xuan.

The film is based on the Chinese theatrical adaptation of Maxim Gorky's 1902 play The Lower Depths by playwright Ke Ling. The play and the film were both banned in China during the Cultural Revolution but were popular in the post-Mao period.

References

External links
 Night Inn at the China Movie Database
 Night Inn at China's Movie Database
 Zhou Xuan at China's Movie Database
 

1947 films
1940s Mandarin-language films
1947 drama films
Chinese films based on plays
Films based on works by Maxim Gorky
Chinese black-and-white films
Chinese drama films